Integrin beta-8 is a protein that in humans is encoded by the ITGB8 gene.

Function 

This gene is a member of the integrin beta chain family and encodes a single-pass type I membrane protein with a VWFA domain and four cysteine-rich repeats. This protein noncovalently binds to an alpha subunit to form a heterodimeric integrin complex. In general, integrin complexes mediate cell-cell and cell-extracellular matrix interactions and this complex plays a role in human airway epithelial proliferation. Alternatively spliced variants which encode different protein isoforms have been described; however, not all the variants have been fully characterized.  Additionally, it has been shown to interact with RhoGDI1 to alter the activation of Rho GTPases to promote Glioblastoma cell invasiveness.  Uncoupling the αvβ8-RhoGDI1 interaction has been seen to block GBM cell invasion by hyperactivating Rho GTPases.

Clinical significance 

High expression levels of ITGB8 are associated with high angiogenic and poorly invasive glioblastoma tumors.  Conversely low expression of ITGB8 correlates with highly invasive but low angiogenic tumors.

References

Further reading

External links
ITGB8 Info with links in the Cell Migration Gateway 

Integrins